Geinitzia is an extinct genus of conifers, with an uncertain position within the group. Species belonging to the genus lived in the late Cretaceous and have been found in Argentina and Europe.

Species
A number of species have been described in Geinitzia.
Geinitzia cretacea
Geinitzia formosa
Geinitzia reichenbachii
Geinitzia schlotheimii

References 

Cretaceous plants
Pinales
Prehistoric gymnosperm genera